The diocese of Bùi Chu is a Roman Catholic diocese of Vietnam. It encompasses 4/5 of Nam Định Province in terms of area, including the six districts of Xuân Trường, Giao Thủy, Hải Hậu, Nghĩa Hưng, Trực Ninh, and Nam Trực and part of Nam Định city. The current bishop of the diocese since August 2013 is Thomas Aquinas Vũ Đình Hiệu.

Overview 
Bùi Chu Diocese covers an area of 1,350 km², and is a suffragan diocese of the Archdiocese of Hanoi.

From the late 17th century until 1930s, this was a center of the Spanish Dominican mission in Vietnam. The covering area of Bùi Chu is the same as at present as it has been from 1936, when it still was an apostolic vicariate. It was declared a diocese on November 24, 1960.

By 2018, the Diocese of Bùi Chu had about 409,000 believers (32.8% of the population) in 176 parishes.

The diocese is divided into 13 deaneries: Báo Đáp, Bùi Chu, Đại Đồng, Kiên Chính, Lạc Đạo, Liễu Đề, Ninh Cường, Phú Nhai, Quần Phương, Quỹ Nhất, Thức Hóa, Tứ Trùng, and Tương Nam.

Sites 
The Queen of the Holy Rosary Cathedral in Xuân Ngọc Commune, Xuân Trường District, which has been assigned as the see (the location of the cathedral and its Bishop's chair, and thus the headquarters) of the diocese. There are 12 Shrines in the diocese. The Basilica of Immaculate Conception, Phu Nhai is one of them.

There is a traditional charity centre called Nhà Dục Anh (Orphanage House) in the northwest side of the Bùi Chu Cathedral.

References

Bui Chu
Christian organizations established in 1960
Roman Catholic dioceses and prelatures established in the 20th century
Bui Chu, Roman Catholic Diocese of
1960 establishments in North Vietnam